Dicksonia antarctica, the soft tree fern or man fern, is a species of evergreen tree fern native to eastern Australia, ranging from south-east Queensland, coastal New South Wales and Victoria to Tasmania.

Anatomy and biology 
They are very hairy at the base of the stipe (adjoining the trunk) and on the crown. The shapes of the stems vary as some grow curved and there are multi-headed ones. The fronds are borne in flushes, with fertile and sterile fronds often in alternating layers.

The "trunk" of this fern is merely the decaying remains of earlier growth of the plant and forms a medium through which the roots grow. The trunk is usually solitary, without runners, but may produce offsets. They can be cut down and, if they are kept moist, the top portions can be replanted and will form new roots. The stump, however, will not regenerate since it is dead organic matter. In nature, the fibrous trunks are hosts for a range of epiphytic plants including other ferns and mosses.

The fern grows at 3.5 to 5 cm per year and produces spores at the age of about 20 years.

Reproduction 
Reproduction by this species is primarily from spores, but it can also be grown from plantlets occurring around the base of the rhizome.

In cultivation, it can also be grown as a "cutting", a method not to be encouraged unless the tree-fern is doomed to die in its present position. This involves sawing the trunk through, usually at ground level, and removing the fronds; the top part will form roots and regrow, but the base will die.

Habitat 
The fern grows on damp, sheltered woodland slopes and moist gullies, and they occasionally occur at high altitudes in cloud forests. Dicksonia antarctica is the most abundant tree fern in South Eastern Australia.

The plant can grow in acid, neutral and alkaline soils. It can grow in semi-shade. It strongly resents drought or dryness at the roots, and does best in moist soil.

Cultivation 

Dicksonia antarctica grows best in areas of rainfall of over 1,000 mm per year but in lower rainfall areas does well in moist gullies. It is tolerant of fire and re-shoots readily after re-location. It can provide habitat for epiphytes and also provides shelter for more delicate fern species to flourish underneath.

Plant in organic soils and ensure the fern is kept mulched and watered. Dicksonia antarctica generally requires a minimum rainfall of 500 mm (20 inches) per year. In dry climates, a drip irrigation or spray system applied overhead is the most effective method of watering.

It is best to leave old fronds on the plant in order to protect the trunk from cold and desiccation. Winter protection of the trunk is recommended during prolonged or severe cold weather.

This plant is particularly suited to garden planting and landscaping purposes. It has gained the Royal Horticultural Society's Award of Garden Merit.

Harvesting 
Large Dicksonia antarctica available for sale come from old growth Tasmanian forests, and may be hundreds of years old.  The trunks are also available legally from local suppliers who licence collection of minor species from Forestry Tasmania, the State Government GBE who manage forestry.

Edibility 

The soft tree fern can be used as a food source, with the pith of the plant being eaten either cooked or raw. It is a good source of starch.

The 1889 book 'The Useful Native Plants of Australia records that "The pulp of the top of the trunk is full of starch, and is eaten by the aboriginals [sic.] both raw and roasted. The native blacks [sic.] of the colony used to split open about a foot and a-half of the top of the trunk, and take out the heart,
in substance resembling a Swedish turnip, and of the thickness of a man's arm. This they either roasted in the ashes, or ate as bread; but it is too bitter and astringent to suit an English palate. (Gunn)"

See also
Cyathea howeana
Richea pandanifolia

References

External links

 Plants For a Future: Dicksonia antarctica
 Australian National Botanic Gardens: Dicksonia antarctica – the soft tree fern
 Large, M.F. and J.E. Braggins 2004. Tree Ferns. Timber Press, Inc. 
 Fern Files: Dicksonia antarctica

Dicksoniaceae
Ferns of Australia
Flora of New South Wales
Flora of Tasmania
Flora of Victoria (Australia)
Trees of Australia
Trees of mild maritime climate
Garden plants of Oceania
Ornamental trees
Plants described in 1807